John Handcock (1755 – October 1786) was an Irish politician and soldier.

He was a descendant of Eliah Handcock, second son of Thomas Handcock and his wife Doroth Green. Handcock was a captain in the artillery and major of Charles Fort. He served later as lieutenant-governor of Kinsale. In 1776, he entered the Irish House of Commons.

References

 

1755 births
1786 deaths
Irish MPs 1776–1783
Members of the Parliament of Ireland (pre-1801) for King's County constituencies